Sir Claude William Champion de Crespigny, 3rd Baronet,  (25 June 1818 – 11 August 1868) was an English first-class cricketer and British Army officer.

The son of Augustus James Champion de Crespigny, he was born at Mayfair in June 1818. His father died from yellow fever in 1825, with his grandfather Sir William Champion de Crespigny passing away in 1829. Upon the death of his grandfather, he succeeded him as the 3rd Baronet of the Champion de Crespigny baronets. He was educated at Winchester College, before going up to Trinity College, Cambridge. He later made a single appearance in first-class cricket for the Marylebone Cricket Club against Cambridge University at Cambridge in 1843. He made scores of 0 and 3 in the match, being dismissed by Richard Blaker and Thomas Fiott Hughes respectively; his brother, Frederick, was in the Cambridge side. Champion de Crespigny was appointed a deputy lieutenant for Essex in August 1852. In the same year he married Mary Tyrell, daughter of Sir John Tyrell, 2nd Baronet. He was commissioned as a lieutenant the 1st Essex Volunteer Rifles in September 1859, formed in response to the French invasion scare in 1859. In January 1860, he was promoted to captain, before being made a lieutenant colonel in June of the same year. He also held the office of receiver-general of the Droits of Admiralty. Champion de Crespigny died at Wivenhoe Hall in Wivenhoe in August 1868. He was succeeded as the 4th Baronet by his son, Sir Claude Champion de Crespigny.

References

External links

1818 births
1868 deaths
People from Mayfair
Baronets in the Baronetage of the United Kingdom
People educated at Winchester College
Alumni of Trinity College, Cambridge
English cricketers
Marylebone Cricket Club cricketers
Deputy Lieutenants of Essex
Essex Regiment officers
Military personnel from Middlesex
19th-century British Army personnel